Mathilde Juncker (born 3 March 1993) is a Danish handball player for SK Aarhus and the Danish national team.

References

1993 births
Living people
Danish female handball players
Handball players at the 2010 Summer Youth Olympics
Youth Olympic gold medalists for Denmark
People from Roskilde
Sportspeople from Region Zealand